The Imo State Executive Council (also known as, the Cabinet of Imo State) is the highest formal governmental body that plays important roles in the Government of Imo State headed by the Governor of Imo State. It consists of the Deputy Governor, Secretary to the State Government, Chief of Staff, Head of Service and Commissioners who preside over ministerial departments along with the Governor's special aides.

Functions
The Executive Council exists to advise and direct the Governor. Their appointment as members of the Executive Council gives them the authority to execute power over their fields.

Current cabinet
The current Executive Council is serving under the Hope Uzodinma's administration.

Principal Officers

Commissioners

References

Imo
Imo State